Compagnie Nationale à Portefeuille SA ("CNP"), is a Belgian non-listed holding company. Together with Groupe Bruxelles Lambert, CNP is one of the main pillars of Groupe Frère-Bourgeois (founded by Albert, Baron frère) and can rely on a stable shareholders’ base: it is exclusively controlled by the Frère family.

Investments
CNP directly holds stakes in a number of industrial companies, which at the end of 2014 included: 
 Total (0.9%), the fifth-largest publicly traded integrated international oil and gas company in the world, active both on the upstream (exploration/production) and downstream (refining, distribution) segments
 M6 (7.3%), a multimedia group that revolves around M6, France’s second commercial TV channel, and also includes a family of highly complementary digital channels and diversification activities developed around a powerful brand
  (88%) that operates in the petroleum products, gas, coal and coke trading and distribution sectors, through owned or rented assets (pipelines, storage facilities, oil tankers, refineries…)
 Affichage Holding (25.3%), advertising company
 Cheval Blanc Finance, that holds 50% of the Société Civile du Cheval Blanc, which owns the Saint Emilion Premier Grand Cru Classé A estate (37 hectares), la Tour du Pin(8 hectares) and Quinault l’Enclos (18 hectares) vineyards
 Caffitaly (49%)
 International Duty Free (100%), the operator of retail shops at the main Belgian airports (Brussels, Charleroi) and at Brussels international railway station

Ownership and control
In March 2011 CNP was delisted, after a successful takeover bid from Groupe Frère-Bourgeois (70% economic ownership) and BNP Paribas (30%) for the 27.8% of CNP they did not already own. The CNP share was removed from the BEL 20 index on 2 May 2011.

Groupe Frère-Bourgeois acquired BNP Paribas’s stake in CNP at the end of 2013. As a result, CNP is now exclusively controlled by Groupe Frère-Bourgeois, alongside management and personnel.

References

Companies based in Hainaut (province)